Loudoun United FC is an American professional soccer team based in Leesburg, Virginia. The team was founded in 2018 as the reserve team of D.C. United and made its debut in the USL Championship in 2019.

History
On July 18, 2018, the team was officially announced by USL and D.C. United as were the team's name, colors and crest. Loudoun United FC replaced Richmond Kickers as D.C. United's USL affiliate.

After the founding of MLS Next Pro in 2022 and the subsequent movement of MLS reserve teams to that league by 2023, Loudoun United remains the only MLS-affiliated reserve side in the USL system; due to a legal agreement for leasing Segra Field, United is required to play in the second division.

On February 2, 2023, Loudoun United FC was sold to Attain Sports and Entertainment, which owns minor league baseball teams Bowie Baysox and Frederick Keys. D.C. United will continue to own a minority stake in Loudoun United. Furthermore, the change of ownership also means that Loudoun United is eligible to participate in the 2023 U.S. Open Cup.

Colors and badge
Loudoun United FC colors are black, red and white, the same as parent club D.C. United. The club's crest contains the red-and-white gyronny seen in the flag and coat of arms of Loudoun County, as well as a winged horse in homage to both D.C. United's eagle logo and the county's long association with equestrian sports.

Sponsorship

Stadium
The club plays at Segra Field, a new 5,000-seat stadium at Philip A. Bolen Memorial Park in Leesburg. The stadium was built by D.C. United and the county government for $15 million. Construction began in 2018, and was completed in August 2019. After playing some initial home games at Audi Field, they debuted in their new stadium in a game against the Charlotte Independence that ended 3–3 in front of 5,015 spectators.

Club culture 
The main supporter group of Loudoun United is the Loudoun Stampede. The supporter group hosts tailgates, events, and watch parties.

Players and staff

Roster

Staff

Team records

Year-by-year

1. Top scorer includes statistics from league matches only.

Head coaches
 Includes USL regular season, USL playoffs, U.S. Open Cup. Excludes friendlies.

Average attendance

References

External links
 

 
USL Championship teams
Reserve soccer teams in the United States
Soccer clubs in Virginia
Leesburg, Virginia
2018 establishments in Virginia
Association football clubs established in 2018
Sports in Northern Virginia